The Lisbon Academy of Sciences  is Portugal's national academy dedicated to the advancement of sciences and learning, with the goal of promoting academic progress and prosperity in Portugal. It is one of Portugal's most prestigious scientific authorities and the official regulator of the Portuguese language in Portugal, through its Class of Letters.

History

The academy was founded on 24 December 1779 in Lisbon, Portugal, by João Carlos de Bragança, Duke de Lafões, who served as the academy's first President, and José Correia da Serra, who served as its first secretary-general. Domenico Vandelli was among its mentors and early organizers.

The academy received royal patronage under Queen Maria I of Portugal in 1783, bestowing the title of Royal Academy of Sciences (Real Academia das Ciências) unto the institution.

The seat of the academy in Lisbon has been located in the Bairro Alto district of Lisbon since 1834.

Organization
The Academy has two classes: the Class of Sciences and the Class of Letters, and each has 30 full members and 60 corresponding members distributed in six sections. It also has a number of foreign members.

The Academy was one of the first national members of the International Council for Science, is one of two Portuguese members of the European Science Foundation and is the Portuguese partner of the European Science Exchange Programme of The Royal Society (United Kingdom).

Gallery

See also
Lisbon Academy of Sciences, Class of Letters
Culture of Portugal
Science and technology in Portugal

References

External links

1779 establishments in Portugal
Grand Crosses of the Order of Saint James of the Sword
Members of the International Council for Science
Portugal
Portugal
Academy of Sciences
Portuguese language academies
Academy of Sciences
Scientific organizations established in 1779
Members of the International Science Council